Jessie is a fictional cowgirl rag doll who appears in the Disney-Pixar Toy Story franchise making her debut in Toy Story 2. She serves as one of the primary characters and is primarily voiced by Joan Cusack in the films and most other media, with Kat Cressida voicing the character in the Disney Infinity series.

In the franchise, Jessie is a brave and excitable rag doll who carries a great deal of sadness, as her original owner outgrew her and abandoned her. Years of being in storage have made her somewhat withdrawn, leading her to develop claustrophobia and abandonment issues. She eventually longs to be a source of joy to a child after being rescued by Woody, and spends years with her new owner, Andy Davis. Years later, she and most of her friends are donated to Bonnie Anderson, who claims Jessie as her new favorite toy. With Woody's departure after reuniting with Bo Peep, she is given his sheriff badge as a token of her significance to Bonnie.

The idea of Jessie was suggested by Nancy Lasseter, while John Lasseter, Pete Docter, Ash Brannon, and Andrew Stanton developed and created the character. Jessie has received a positive reception since her debut, with praise towards her significance to the franchise, personality, and Joan Cusack's vocal performance.

Development

In the original manuscript of Toy Story 2, a doll by the name Señorita Cactus was originally supposed to be one of the main antagonists of the film. The development of Jessie was kindled by director John Lasseter's wife Nancy, who pressed him to include a strong female character in the sequel, one with more substance than Bo Peep.

Characteristics
Jessie is depicted as being hyper, hearty, energetic, and outgoing, and noticeably more free-spirited and loose than the orderly and calm Woody. Joan Cusack, the most frequent voice of Jessie, has described her as a "can-do girl." She is also slightly tomboyish. In the television series Woody's Roundup, Jessie is portrayed as being equally bubbly, rambunctious, and adventurous, aided by woodland creatures represented by obvious string puppets. She is also a talented yodeler.

Despite Jessie's extreme cheerfulness and sunny personality, she is scarred by a bleak and slightly depressing and melancholy background, when she was outgrown and abandoned by her owner Emily. She spent years afterward as a collector's item owned by Al packaged in a dark cardboard box along with Prospector and Bullseye, and was permanently scarred with claustrophobia and nyctophobia as a result, thrusting herself into horrible panic attacks when in confined spaces or faced with the threat of being stored away again. For years, she also was marked with a strong sense of feeling unloved, which she masked with her extreme playfulness, which was pacified after having been adopted by Andy. However, in the third film, when Andy was preparing to leave for college, she says "I should have seen this coming! It's Emily all over again!".

She has green eyes, red yarn hair pulled into a braid, pale plastic skin, and a small nose. She also has a yellow ribbon tied to the bottom of her braided hair, a white long-sleeved western-style shirt that includes a bright yellow bodice and cuffs complete with swirling red designs, blue jeans, a pair of white chaps with cow spots all over, brown boots, matching belt with gold buckle, red cowgirl hat, and a pullstring on her back with a white loop attached to it.

Appearances

Films

Toy Story 2

Jessie is the second toy to greet Woody in Al's apartment after he is stolen by Al McWhiggin. Upon meeting the cowgirl and the other members of his collection, Woody learns that he is a rare vintage doll based on a character of the same name from a popular 1950s series titled Woody's Roundup. But once he learns that he and the others will be sold to a toy museum in Tokyo, Woody tells the others that he needs to get back home to his owner, which causes Jessie to become frustrated. Having a fear of close spaces and the idea of being kept in storage hurts Jessie emotionally, causing her to indirectly lash her feelings at Woody. After his arm is torn off, Woody has no choice to stay and get it fixed, while also blaming Jessie for waking Al later that night. However, Woody has a change in heart after hearing of Jessie's traumatic past, as she was once loved by a girl named Emily, became a childhood trinket, and was abandoned in a donation box on the side of the road. As a result, Woody decides to stay with his roundup gang, with Al preparing for his flight.

In the later afternoon, a group of Andy's toys show up to rescue Woody, but refuses. Changing his mind once more, Woody decides to go back to his owner, and asks Jessie and Bullseye to come with him, but before they can do so, it is revealed that Stinky Pete will not let them leave, and the group is taken to the airport. Following the Prospector's defeat, Woody and Bullseye are able to escape the suitcase, but Jessie is taken to the airplane. Woody takes Bullseye, with the help of Buzz, and attempts to save her from the plane bound for Japan. He is able to save the cowgirl, and the toys head home. Once Andy arrives home from Cowboy Camp, he is greeted by a setup of toys, including Jessie and Bullseye, and accepts them into his collection, dubbing her as "Bazooka Jane."

Toy Story 3

In Toy Story 3, after Andy seemingly throws them away, it is Jessie who convinces the other toys to be given to Sunnyside Daycare, refusing to relive the trauma she felt when she was given away by Emily. She fails to realize that Andy intended to put them in the attic and that his mother threw them out by accident, and stubbornly refuses to listen to Woody when he tries to clear up the misunderstanding, arguing that Andy has moved on and that they must do the same.

Jessie is thrilled to learn that the children at Sunnyside are replaced with new children when they grow older, meaning the toys can never be outgrown. She tries to persuade Woody to join the others in beginning their lives anew at the daycare, but Woody reluctantly calls her and the other toys selfish; leaving to return to Andy alone. Jessie and the other toys discover they have been placed in a room with very young children, who abuse them in an extremely rough(yet innocent)way. Jessie gets her hair painted green, much to her disgust.

Afterward, Mrs. Potato Head sees Andy searching for his missing toys through her eye that was left in his room, allowing Jessie and the others to realize that they were wrong about Andy. They decide to return home, only for Lotso to order his henchmen to imprison them with the help of a reset Buzz. Even in his demo mode, Buzz still remains somewhat attracted to Jessie(at least to an extent); calling her a "temptress" and being immune to her "bewitching good looks".

Following another rough play date with the young children, Andy's toys are reunited with Woody, who had a change of heart and returned to rescue his friends. Jessie apologizes for not listening to Woody, who apologizes in return for leaving. The toys carry out their plan to break out of Sunnyside but matters are further complicated when they accidentally reset Buzz into a Spanish version of his deluded self. The Spanish Buzz makes his love extremely apparent; passionately wooing her. Jessie is initially uncomfortable with this drastic change, but grows to like this romantic side of Buzz.

When the toys get stuck in a garbage truck along with Lotso, Jessie is rescued by the Spanish Buzz, who ended up crushed by a broken television set. Jessie despairs over Buzz's apparent death, but he sporadically reawakens as his normal self and unharmed. Jessie hugs him in relief before repeatedly kissing him on the cheek in saying thanks for saving her (much to Buzz's confusion). The toys end up dumped in a landfill and nearly killed in a trash incinerator from Lotso abandoning them. Andy's Alien toys rescue them all using a crane.

Once safely outside the incinerator, Jessie and Buzz's mutual looks indicate the clear understanding of their feelings for each other. The toys return home to Andy and prepare to be stored in the attic; with Woody's intervention, though, they are instead given to Bonnie, a girl who took Woody to her home while he was away. Andy plays with his toys one last time. Jessie quickly adapts to her new life as one of Bonnie's toys. She decides to take advantage of Buzz's Spanish personality so they can dance together to "Hay Un Amigo En Mí" (the Spanish version of "You've Got a Friend in Me"); finally sealing their romantic relationship.

Toy Story 4
During the prologue, set between the events of Toy Story 2 and Toy Story 3, Jessie helps Woody, Bo Peep, and others save RC from the storm. Present day, Jessie is now Bonnie's favorite toy, giving her Woody's badge as a result. After Bonnie creates Forky, her parents decide to go on a road trip, taking several of her toys with her. However, Forky ends up escaping, and Woody follows behind him. The following morning, Buzz takes it upon himself to find Woody, resulting in Jessie becoming the temporary leader. Bonnie's parents begin to leave, but Jessie is able to stop them by popping the RV tires. At night, Jessie comes up with an idea to slow down Bonnie's parents and to meet up with Woody, Buzz, and Forky. Once the vehicle is parked in front of the carousel, Jessie and the other toys reunite with Bo Peep. Woody, deciding not to go back home, gives Jessie his badge, and results in a heartwarming farewell and departure. The following year, Jessie introduces Karen Beverly to Bonnie's other toys, which gets the attention of Forky.

Other films

Jessie was featured as a minor character in Toy Story That Time Forgot, a television special for ABC. In Toy Story of Terror!, Jessie appears as the main protagonist who confronts her fear of claustrophobia. In the Pixar Popcorn short, "To Fitness and Beyond", she appears stretching and jumping with the rest of the toys. Jessie also appears in all 3 shorts of the Toy Story Toons.

She makes several cameo appearances in other Disney films, including Monsters, Inc. as one of Boo's toys, Meet the Robinsons on a basketball poster, and as a cloud silhouette in Ralph Breaks the Internet.

Miscellaneous

Theme parks and attractions
In Toy Story Midway Mania!, Jessie and her friends are featured in the interactive dark ride at Disney California Adventure and Disney's Hollywood Studios. Woody and Jessie are featured in Big Thunder Ranch's outdoor stage and dining area, and Woody's Roundup Village's meet and greet area. They can also be found in the Splash Mountain courtyard in Frontierland at the Magic Kingdom. Woody and Jessie are featured in the North America Room of It's a Small World. In 2019, Jessie's Critter Carousel opened at Disney California Adventure. In 2022, Jessie's Trading Post Store and Roundup Rodeo Barbecue Opening in Toy Story Land at Disney's Hollywood Studios.

Merchandise

Disney heavily promoted Jessie following the release of Toy Story 2, as she gave them a character that they could market to girls, something the original film did not really provide. Among the items released were:
Several 10" and 12" fashion-style dolls
Several plush and rag doll-type dolls
Action figures in the Toy Story 2 and Toy Story and Beyond lines.
Wallets, purses and other accessories for girls
Nightlights and other bedroom accessories
Costumes and dress-up sets
High-end sculptures and collectibles
Following the film's release, many stores were sold out of Jessie dolls. During the 1999 Christmas season, the Atlanta journal reported dolls being sold for three-times their retail price on eBay.

Video games

Jessie has been featured in numerous Disney and Pixar-related video games. She makes an appearance in Toy Story 2: Buzz Lightyear to the Rescue, and is featured as a playable character in Toy Story 3: The Video Game. She is also playable in Disney Infinity and Disney Infinity 3.0, voiced by Kat Cressida. Additionally, a character skin for Jessie, after the release of Toy Story 4, became unlockable through in-app purchases in Minecraft in 2019. In 2018, Jessie became an unlockable character for the mobile game Disney Heroes: Battle Mode.

Reception and legacy

Jessie has received a largely positive reception. Joan Cusack, who prominently voices Jessie in most media, has received praise for her vocal performance as the character over the years. As a result, Cusack won the category for Female Voice Acting in a Feature Production at the 2000 Annie Awards for her voiceover work as Jessie in Toy Story 2. Jessie also received the Patsy Montana Entertainer Award from the National Cowgirl Museum and Hall of Fame. Cusack was also praised by Barry Levitt from Looper.com writing, "Cusack is perfect in bringing Jessie to life and deserves a magnificent starring role." He also said that Jessie was the second most popular Toy Story character and that she had "the single most emotional scene from the franchise".

Tim Luisi cites Jessie as a turning point in the Toy Story franchise's gendered representations of support and describes her as the franchise's first female character who was as important as the male characters. Jessie has been described as a "strong, independent and assertive female character", though Lilian Munk Rösing describes this strength as "boyish" and "manic". Rolling Stone ranked Jessie as 5th best pixar movie character, claiming that "Jessie projects a sunny disposition to hide a deep psychic wound: Her beloved human Emily grew up and discarded her". Psychologists Alan M. Schwitzer and Lawrence C. Rubin described Jessie's arc in Toy Story 2 as "a poignant story of abandonment, loss, and reconnection." Ian Goodwill of Comic Book Resources and Jerrica Tisdale of CinemaBlend said that Jessie is one of the Toy Story characters that needs a movie going over her background. Body+Souls Courtney Thompson said that Jessie was not the feminist hero she could have been stating, "Jessie, our one ray of hope in that she is explicitly adventurous, independent and funny, gets the sexist treatment by creating a romance storyline for her." However, Matthew Wilkinson of Screen Rant, ranking her as the best supporting character in Toy Story, stated, "Jessie really brought the girl power into the franchise in a big way." The developing relationship with Buzz Lightyear has also received positive commentary, as it "could be considered a subversion of the romance tropes that feature an aggressive male and a meek female", and the two characters do not "seem to abide by stereotypical parameters of gender when it comes to their romance". It is an example of relationship of a "wholesome nature", built on "healthy and consensual feelings that Buzz and Jessie bear for one another".

Jessie is the namesake of version 8 of the Debian operating system, with other releases also named after characters from the Toy Story films.

References

External links

Official character page

Toy Story characters
Fictional cowboys and cowgirls
Fictional dolls and dummies
Fictional sheriffs
Fictional yodelers
Film characters introduced in 1999
Female characters in animated films
Animated characters introduced in 1999
1990s toys
Female characters in film
Rag dolls